The Shooting at the 1981 Southeast Asian Games was held between 7 December to 12 December at Fort Bonifacio, Philippines.

Medal summary

Men's

Women's

Medal table

References

 Results The Straits Times, 8 December 1981, p. 39
 Results The Straits Times, 9 December 1981, p. 39
 Results The Straits Times, 10 December 1981, p. 39
 Results The Straits Times, 11 December 1981, p. 39
 Results The Straits Times, 12 December 1981, p. 39
 Results The Straits Times 13 December 1981, p. 30

1981 Southeast Asian Games events